The Sibiu Cycling Tour (Cycling Tour of Sibiu until 2015) is a 2.1 category professional bicycle road race held in Sibiu, Romania. Its first edition took place in July 2011, as part of the UCI Europe Tour. The race is organised with the support of the local council as well as the regional council of Sibiu. Held entirely around the city, the race normally runs over four days including a prologue on the cobbled streets of the city, and two climbing stages, one on the Transfăgărăşan Road to Bâlea Lac and a second to the mountain resort of Păltiniș.

Overall winners

Classifications
As of the 2018 edition, the jerseys worn by the leaders of the individual classifications are:
 – Yellow Jersey  – The Yellow Jersey is worn by the leader of the overall classification. 
 – White Jersey  – The White Jersey is worn by the leader of the overall mountains classification.(white jersey prior to 2018)
 – Orange Jersey – Worn by the best rider under 23 years of age on the overall classification. 
 – Blue Jersey – Worn by the leader of the sprints classification. 
 – Red Jersey – The Red Jersey presented to the leading Romanian rider on the overall classification.  
 – Green Jersey – Presented to the leader of the points classification. (Previously wore a white jersey)  
Additionally 
 – Grey Jersey – To the team leading the team classification (Not worn in race) 
From 2018 the red jersey and green jerseys were presented on the podium only and not worn in race.

Editions

2011
The Cycling Tour of Sibiu 2011 took place from July 6 to 10, 2011, organised as a 2.2 race on the UCI Europe Tour. A total distance of 446.5 km. The race included five days of competition including a team time trial in the center of Sibiu. A total of 20 teams took part, with a total prize money of 26,000 euros. The race was originally won by Vladimir Koev but he was later stripped of all results from 2010 and 2011 following a positive test at the 2010 Tour of Romania.

2012
The Cycling Tour of Sibiu 2012 took place from July 4 to 8, 2012, organised as a 2.2 race on the UCI Europe Tour. The race for the first time included an opening prologue time trial and covered a total of 432.95 km.

2013
The Cycling Tour of Sibiu 2013 took place from July 11 to 14. For the third edition the race was upgraded to UCI category 2.1 allowing UCI Pro Continental Teams to take part. Three Pro Continental teams accepted invites,,  and  although Vini Fantini would later withdraw after positive doping tests at the 2013 Giro d'Italia. At 479.5 km the race was the longest to date despite being reduced to four days, with two stages taking place on the final day.

2014
The 2014 Sibiu Tour took place between the July 17 and 20. At 530 km the race was the longest to date, and once more featured the traditional cobbled prologue and stages to Balea Lac and Paltanis. Returning to the race for the first time since 2012 was a team time trial on the final day. The 2014 race featured two Pro Continental teams, CCC Polsat and Androni Giocattoli along with 20 continental and national teams competing for a prize fund of €29,889

2015

The 2015 Tour of Sibiu took place between 1 July and 5 July. For the first time it was raced over 5 days, and moved forward in the calendar by nearly three weeks. It was expected that the teams of all the jersey winners and stage winners from 2014, Adria Mobil, CCC Sprandi Polkowice, Verandas Willems and Parkhotel Valkenburg Continental Team, would compete again in 2015. Adria Mobil later withdrew to be replaced by Southeast Pro Cycling taking the number of pro-continental teams in the race to four. The race was wn by Mauro Finetto who won the mountain stage to Paltanis and was able to retain his jersey through to the finale.

2016

The 2016 Sibiu Cycling Tour took place between July 6 and July 10 having moved forward one week due to the local elections. The race opened with the traditional prologue and for the first time featured a mountain time trial to Bâlea Lac. This edition is featured four pro-continental teams including for the first time a British team ONE Pro Cycling.

The race was won by Nikolay Mihaylov after he was part of a breakaway on Stage 2. The race was notable for its first Romanian stage winner, Andrei Nechita, who won the opening prologue, and also its first Australian stage winner Steele Von Hoff.

2017

The 2017 Sibiu Cycling Tour took place between July 5 and July 9. Featuring a traditional parcours of opening prologue, two intermediate and two mountain stages. The peloton featured three professional Continental teams, 17 Continental teams and a Romanian national team, and for the first time, teams from North America. The race was won by Egan Bernal who became the first Colombian winner.

2018

The 2018 Sibiu Cycling Tour takes place between July 5 and July 8. Featuring a traditional parcours of opening prologue, two mountain stages and for the first time since 2014, a team time trial. The peloton featured three professional Continental teams, fourteen Continental teams and two national teams.

References

External links
 

UCI Europe Tour races
Cycle races in Romania
Recurring sporting events established in 2011
2011 establishments in Romania
Summer events in Romania